Pablo Esteban Vidal Rojas (born 24 June 1983) is a Chilean politician and geographer who served as a member of the Chamber of Deputies of Chile during the 2018−2022 period.

References

External links
 

1983 births
Living people
Pontifical Catholic University of Chile alumni
21st-century Chilean politicians
Democratic Revolution politicians